Kercheval is a surname. Notable people with the surname include:

Albert Fenner Kercheval, American farmer and poet
Jesse Lee Kercheval (born 1956), American academic and writer
Ken Kercheval (1935–2019), American actor
Ralph Kercheval (1911–2010), American football player
Samuel Kercheval (1767–1845), American lawyer and friend of Thomas Jefferson
Thomas A. Kercheval (1837–1915), American politician

See also
 Kercheval, Indiana, unincorporated community, United States